Supreme Soviet elections were held in the Tajik SSR on 25 February 1990. The Communist Party of Tajikistan was the only legal political party at the time, with only independent candidates contesting seats. The CPT won 96% of the 230 seats in Parliament.

References

Elections in Tajikistan
One-party elections
1990 in Tajikistan
Tajikistan
Election and referendum articles with incomplete results